Approved for Adoption (French: Couleur de peau: miel lit. "Colour of skin: honey") is a 2012 French-Belgian-South Korean-Swiss animated film, based on a comic by the Korean-Belgian comic strip artist, Jung, and directed by Laurent Boileau and Jung. It was released on 6 June 2012 in France. It received a Magritte Award nomination for Best Editing.

Cast
 Christelle Cornil : Jung's adoptive mother
 Jean-Luc Couchard : Jung's adoptive father
 David Murgia : Cédric

Awards
 2013 - Japan Media Arts Festival: "Grand Prize" (Animation)
 2013 - World festival of animated film Animafest Zagreb: "Grand prix"
 2013 - World festival of animated film Animafest Zagreb: "Audience award"

References

External links

2010s French animated films
2012 animated films
2012 films
Animated drama films
Films about adoption
Belgian animated films
Films based on Belgian comics
Animated films based on comics
2010s French films